The 83rd Indianapolis 500 was held at the Indianapolis Motor Speedway in Speedway, Indiana, on Sunday, May 30, 1999. The race was sanctioned by the Indy Racing League, and was part of the 1999 Pep Boys Indy Racing League season.

In the closing laps, race leader Robby Gordon ran out of fuel within sight of the white flag. Kenny Bräck took the lead with just over one lap to go and won for car owner A. J. Foyt. The race victory represented the long-awaited "fifth" Indy 500 win for A. J. Foyt, who had previously won a record four times as a driver (1961, 1964, 1967, 1977). It was also one of the most-successful races for A. J. Foyt Enterprises, with Bräck the winner, and team cars Billy Boat third, and Robbie Buhl sixth.

Popular veteran and two-time Indy 500 winner Arie Luyendyk announced his plans to retire at the end of the event. He won the pole position and was a factor most of the first half. After leading 63 laps, however, he crashed while leading after he tangled with a backmarker. Luyendyk would later retract his retirement plans, and made a brief return to Indy from 2001–2003.

As of 2022, this stands as the 29th and final Indy victory for Goodyear tires.

As of 2021 this stands as the oldest Indianapolis 500 with all 33 starters still living.

Background

Continuing split from CART
The ongoing IRL/CART split continued into its fourth year. For the third year in a row, no major teams from the CART series entered at Indianapolis. The CART series raced on Saturday of Memorial Day weekend at the Motorola 300 at Gateway near St. Louis. However, the 1999 race would end up being the final year that the CART teams stayed away. In 2000, Ganassi would return, and in subsequent years other would as well.

Two regular CART drivers attempted to race at both Gateway and Indy in the same weekend. Robby Gordon, who was running his own team full-time in CART, entered in both the Saturday CART event at Gateway and at Sunday's Indianapolis 500. Gordon's association to full-time IRL team John Menard was a critical piece in having a competitive Indy 500 attempt.  Also attempting the open wheel "double duty" was veteran Roberto Moreno. Moreno had been racing regularly in CART since 1996, and had competed at Indy previously in 1986.  After missing the IRL opener at Walt Disney World, Moreno ran IRL races in 1999 at Phoenix, Charlotte (canceled), and the Indy 500 with Truscelli Racing. At the same time, Moreno was picked up in early May by PacWest Racing in CART to fill in for the injured Mark Blundell and raced for them for eight rounds. As such, Moreno became slated for an unexpected double duty weekend. Then Moreno was hired for the next six CART races at Newman-Haas racing to fill in for the injured Christian Fittipaldi.  Neither driver raced again in the IRL during the 1999 season.

Double Duty
For the third time, a driver attempted the Indy/Charlotte "Double Duty". Tony Stewart, who switched full-time to NASCAR for 1999, also entered a car at Indy. With backing from his regular sponsor The Home Depot and support from his car owner Joe Gibbs, Stewart was attempting to become the first driver to complete the entire 1,100 in one day. Previous attempts by John Andretti (1994) and Robby Gordon (1997) did not see either driver complete the full distance. He succeeded in completing both races, finishing ninth in this race and fourth at Charlotte.

Team and driver changes
Team Menard saw the biggest offseason changes, with 1997 season champion Tony Stewart departing for NASCAR. Greg Ray was hired to fill the vacancy. Robbie Buhl also left Menard and joined Foyt Racing for Indy.

At Treadway Racing, Arie Luyendyk returned for what was planned to be his final race.

Rule changes
Chassis and engine rules remained the same from 1998. All entries utilized 4.0 L normally aspirated engines, with a rev limit of 10,300 rpm. This was the last year for use of the first generation IRL chassis, which were introduced in 1997.

For 1999, the pit road speed limit was reduced to 80 mph. From 1992-1998, the speed limit had been 100 mph.

Wheel tethers were required in time for the race to prevent tires from flying off cars during crashes and potentially injuring spectators and drivers. This came in direct response to the tragic crash on May 1 at Charlotte where a wheel assembly was punted into the grandstands, killing three spectators and injuring eight.

All car numbers decals were required to be a standard black font on a white box. The number locations were standardized; one on the nose, one on the left side above the fuel buckeye, and one on the right. The number panel on the right side was larger than the one on the left, and more centered vertically.

Race schedule

Practice

Rookie Orientation & Open Testing
For the second year in a row, practice and qualifying during the month of May was trimmed down to a compressed "two week" schedule. In addition, for the second time, an open test was conducted in early April, which also included the annual rookie orientation program.

Rookie orientation was scheduled for April 8–9, while open testing was scheduled for April 10–13. Ten drivers took laps during rookie orientation, with nine passing all four phases. Jeret Schroeder (216.596 mph) turned the fastest lap of the session on Saturday April 10. All track activity on Friday April 9 was rained out.

During the veteran's open test, Greg Ray turned the fastest lap of the week at 227.072 mph. Tyce Carlson was second at 225.683 mph.

Opening Day – Saturday May 15
Opening day for the month of May was held Saturday May 15 under sunny skies and temperatures in the high 70s. Stéphan Grégoire, in a car owned by Dick Simon was the first car out of the garage, and the first car on the track, continuing a tradition held by Simon-owned entries.

Greg Ray (225.887 mph) ran the fastest lap of the day. No serious incidents were reported, but Ray, Mike Groff, Robby Unser, Donnie Beechler, and Scott Harrington all brought out yellow flags for blown engines or mechanical failures.

Sunday May 16
About a half-hour into the session, Billy Boat spun and crashed in turn 1. He was uninjured, and returned to the track in a back-up car later in the afternoon.

After racing at Richmond the previous night, Tony Stewart arrived at the Speedway and took his first laps of the month on Sunday. He was 7th-best lap of the day at 222.091 mph.

Greg Ray once again led the speed chart at 225.124 mph.

Monday May 17
The day started with Robby Gordon on the track for the first time during the month. A few minutes later, Mike Borkowski crashed heavily in turn 2 at 11:57 a.m. He climbed from the car uninjured.

Scott Harrington crashed in turn three, and Billy Boat had his second crash in two days. Both drivers were cleared to drive.

At 3:46 p.m., rain began to fall, closing the track early for the day. Greg Ray once more led the speed chart (224.843 mph).

Tuesday May 18
Overnight rain and moisture kept the track closed until 2:00 p.m. Another shower closed it again until almost 4 o'clock. A brief practice session still saw 37 drivers take to the track, and over 1,400 laps completed. Scott Goodyear (223.842 mph) finally bumped Greg Ray off the top of the speed chart.

Wednesday May 19
Rookie Dave Steele crashed hard into the outside wall in turn 1 at 11:33 a.m., suffering a concussion, and was forced to sit out the remainder of the month. About an hour later, Greg Ray blew an engine, and Tyce Carlson who was behind him, slid in the oil laid down by Ray's engine. Carlson spun and tapped the outside wall in the south chute, but the car only suffered minor damage.

The third crash of the day involved Mark Dismore. He hit the wall twice between turns 1 and 2, but was not injured.

With just 30 minutes left in the day, Tony Stewart completed a lap of 226.683 mph, the fastest lap thus far for the month.

Thursday May 20
Crashes were suffered by Johnny Unser and Tony Stewart. Both drivers were uninjured. Greg Ray was back on top of the speed chart at 227.192 mph, fastest of the month.

"Fast" Friday May 21
The final full day of practice saw Greg Ray (227.175 mph) once again top the speed chart. However, Arie Luyendyk (226.131 mph) was close behind in second.

John Paul Jr. was injured in a crash around 1:30 p.m., and he was sidelined for the month with a severe back contusion. Also crashing was Mike Borkowski, his second wreck of the week.

Time trials

Pole Day – Saturday May 22
Time trials opened at 12:00 p.m., with overcast skies and temperatures in the mid-60s. The early attention focused on Tony Stewart, and his busy qualifying schedule. Stewart's attempt at "Double Duty" meant that he was due in Charlotte later that afternoon for The Winston all-star race, and had a tight window in which to qualify at Indy. Stewart was the second car in line to make a qualifying attempt, but settled for a disappointing 220.653 mph run. Minutes later, Stewart was escorted to the airport and departed for Concord, North Carolina. The slow qualifying speed put Stewart in a somewhat precarious situation that left him vulnerable to possibly being bumped before day's end.

At 12:50 p.m., Billy Boat crashed for the third time of the month. On his warmup lap, he spun on cold tires in turn 2, and hit the wall on the backstretch. Minutes later, Robbie Buhl crashed on his warmup lap as well.

At 1:17 p.m., Kenny Brack (222.650 mph) took over the provisional pole position with eight cars in the field. At 1:30 p.m., Arie Luyendyk took to the track, attempting to qualify for what was to be his final Indy 500. His four-lap average of 225.179 mph secured him the pole position, and was a track record for normally-aspirated engines.

The next two hours saw heavy activity, and by 3:30 p.m., the field was filled to 25 cars. The last car with a likely shot at the pole was Greg Ray. After a lap of 225.643 mph (which tied Luyendyk's fastest single lap), Ray ended up second with a four-lap average of 225.073 mph, just 0.075 seconds behind Luyendyk's time.

After a brief down period, activity picked up in the final hour. After crashing earlier in the day, Billy Boat put his car on the outside of the front row. His four-lap average of 223.469 mph was third-fastest. One car, later, Robby Gordon qualified 4th at 223.066 mph.

As time trials closed for the day at 6 o'clock, Scott Harrington completed his run, filling the field to a full 33 cars. It was the first time since 1983 that the field had been completely filled in one afternoon, and was accomplished despite a one-hour rain delay. Tony Stewart's early run held on to put him in 24th starting position.

Luyendyk's pole position was the third of his career (1993, 1997), and his fifth front row start.

Later that night, Tony Stewart won the Winston Open and finished second in The Winston.

Bump Day - Sunday May 23
The second and final day of qualifying opened with rain in the forecast and about six drivers looking to bump their way into the field. During morning practice, Lyn St. James blew an engine and crashed in turn 4. She had entered the day on the bubble, and if she were to be bumped, she would be done for the month. With only six drivers ready, and rain on its way, Tony Stewart's slow speed from Saturday was now considered safe. 

Time trials began at 12 noon, with Raul Boesel easily bumping his way into the field. St. James was bumped, missing the race for the second year in a row. Boesel was followed by Johnny Unser who went even faster. Robbie Buhl, however, was having trouble all weekend. After crashing on Saturday, he blew his engine on his warm up lap, and the team feverishly started installing a new motor.

Andy Michner spun on his first qualifying attempt, but did not make any contact. He waved off his second attempt after being too slow. Rain clouds were entering the area, and threatened to wash out the rest of the day. At 1:48 p.m., Mike Groff (220.066 mph) bumped his way into the field. However, he himself was now on the bubble.

At 1:58 p.m., Foyt Racing had hastily prepared a car for Robbie Buhl and put it in the qualifying line. The car had spare pieces from other machines, and the car number was taped on with black electrical tape. Buhl's run of 220.115 mph barely bumped out Groff, despite sprinkles falling during the last two laps. Seconds after the checkered flag, heavy rain began to fall, all but securing Buhl's spot in the race.

The track closed for the day due to rain with Stéphan Grégoire waiting in line. It was the first time an entry associated with Dick Simon failed to qualify since 1982.

Carb Day - Thursday May 27
The final practice session saw Sam Schmidt (222.458 mph) on top of the speed chart. Scott Goodyear blew an engine, and Jimmy Kite stalled with clutch problems, but no serious incidents were reported.

Robby Gordon skipped the session and was at Gateway for the CART Motorola 300. Greg Ray shook down his car for a few laps. Roberto Moreno, who was also participating at Gateway, did practice for about an hour, then departed for St. Louis. Both drivers came back Sunday for race day.

Tony Stewart returned to the track after his busy weekend. He took part in pole qualifying for the Coca-Cola 600 on Wednesday night, but did not make the top 20 there. He planned on 'standing on his time' at Charlotte and remaining in Indianapolis for the rest of the day. Since Stewart was expected to miss the mandatory NASCAR pre-race drivers meeting, he was poised to start last on the grid at Charlotte regardless of his qualifying speed.

Later in the afternoon, Galles Racing won the Coors Indy Pit Stop Challenge with driver Davey Hamilton.

Starting grid

Alternates
First alternate:  Mike Groff (#46) - Bumped
Second alternate:  Scott Harrington (#66) - Bumped

Failed to Qualify
 Stephan Gregoire (#07) - Bumped
 Jaques Lazier (#15) - Bumped
 Lyn St. James (#90) - Bumped
 Andy Michner (#10) - Wave off
 Nick Firestone  (#31) - Wave off
 Mike Borkowski  (#18) - Practice crash
 Dave Steele  (#43) - Practice crash, injured
 Ronnie Johncox  (#18) - passed rookie orientation
 Troy Regier (#15) - failed rookie orientation

Race summary

Start
Medal of Honor winners were honored during the pre-race ceremonies, coinciding with the unveiling of the Medal of Honor Memorial in Indianapolis. The national anthem was performed by gospel singer CeCe Winans. 

Polesitter Arie Luyendyk jumped out to the early lead, holding the point for the first 32 laps. The first caution flag flew on Lap 9 when Eliseo Salazar got loose coming off turn 2 and slammed into the inside wall.

Pit incident
During the first caution, several cars pitted. In the north section of the pits, Jimmy Kite's car touched the left rear wheel of Jeret Schroeder, sending Kite into the pit box of Robby McGehee. The collision knocked out a few members of McGehee's crew, including crew chief Steve Fried, of Mentor, Ohio, who was working on the right front tire. Fried was initially was listed in critical condition at Methodist Hospital, but later in the race, he was reported as awake and alert. Kite's car suffered extensive internal damage and spent most of the race in the garage for repairs, before retiring late due to engine trouble.

First half
Arie Luyendyk and Greg Ray took turns at the point for nearly all of the first 60 laps. Luyendyk relinquished his lead after making a pit stop on lap 33, and Ray led the next lap before he came in for service. Sam Schmidt inherited the lead until the cars of Roberto Guerrero and Hideshi Matsuda stalled on the track, bringing out a yellow flag. Schmidt and several others pitted under the caution, allowing Luyendyk to retake the lead. Kenny Bräck, the reigning champion of the Indy Racing League, driving for 4-time Indianapolis 500 winner A. J. Foyt, took the lead for the first time on lap 60 after passing Ray in turn 2. 

Sam Schmidt brought out the yellow when he backed into the wall in turn 1 on lap 63. Luyendyk regained the lead following pit stops, but was passed by Bräck shortly after the restart. On lap 84, Ray returned to the lead by passing Brack. Steve Knapp backed into the turn 1 wall to bring out the 4th caution on lap 94. Shortly after the restart on lap 100, Scott Goodyear, another of the prerace favorites, stopped in turn 2 with engine problems  to bring out another yellow flag.

Second half
Arie Luyendyk was leading on lap 118 when he approached the lapped car of Tyce Carlson going into in turn 3. Luyendyk tried to overtake Carlson on the inside of the corner, but grazed the left rear wheel, slid backwards and into the turn 3 wall, bringing out the race's 6th caution. With Luyendyk out of the picture, Greg Ray took over the lead. As Ray completed his pit stop, he moved toward the far lane, unaware that Mark Dismore, who was coming in for his pit stop, was already occupying that lane. Both cars collided and slid into the vacant pit box of Scott Sharp, which was adjacent to Dismore's pit. Dismore continued on, but Ray suffered serious front suspension damage and dropped out of the race. 

Defending Indy 500 champion Eddie Cheever led the field for the restart on lap 124, but was passed by Kenny Bräck and Jeff Ward at the drop of the green. Brack stretched his advantage to as much as 5 seconds. Meanwhile, Tony Stewart had fallen back considerably due to handling problems and made an unscheduled pit stop. Cheever's day suddenly ended on lap 140 due to an engine problem. Bräck made a green-flag stop on lap 150, and Ward grabbed the lead for 2 laps until he pitted, putting Bräck out in front again.

With less than 40 laps left, Bräck and Ward continued to run 1-2. Bräck's teammate at A. J. Foyt Racing, Billy Boat moved up to 3rd place; Mark Dismore was hanging in 4th place despite the pit road mishap on the last yellow flag; and rookie Robby McGehee, despite concerns about the health of his crew chief after the early pit road incident, was in 5th. Also in contention was Team Menard driver Robby Gordon. With teammate Greg Ray already out of the race after the mishap with Dismore, Gordon was left to carry the banner for owner John Menard, who was making his 20th appearance at Indy.

Conclusion
On Lap 162, the caution came out again for Jimmy Kite's stalled car. During the caution, some of the leaders made routine pit stops, Robby Gordon among them. Gordon was running sixth out of seven cars remaining on the lead lap. He came into the pits on lap 164, one lap before the green came back out. The Menard team was gambling by topping off the fuel tank in the hopes he would have enough fuel to last the final 36 laps. The green came out on lap 165, but on lap 169, Mark Dismore brushed the wall off turn 2. The right-front wheel separated and bounced across the track on the backstretch, bringing out the final caution of the race. Most of the leaders pitted under this caution, which would be their final scheduled stops. Gordon stayed out on the track, and shuffled to the lead for the restart which came on lap 174.

As the laps wound down, with twenty to go, Gordon began to build a comfortable lead. His crew insisted that he was ok on fuel. Behind him, with 12 laps remaining, Kenny Bräck made a move around Jeff Ward for second place. Bräck began charging and narrowed the deficit as Gordon struggled to keep fuel in the car. On lap 195, he was 3.5 seconds behind. By lap 198, the lead was less than 2 seconds.

With two laps to go, the lapped car of Robbie Buhl was all that separated Gordon and Bräck. Bräck was 1.5 seconds behind Gordon as they approached turn three. Heading into turn four, Gordon's machine began sputtering and he veered onto pit road, out of fuel. Bräck assumed the lead at the head of the mainstretch and took the white flag to start the final lap. The next time by, the checkered flag waved with Bräck the winner. Gordon settled for 4th place.

Bräck's victory marked the fifth overall Indianapolis 500 victory for A. J. Foyt - four as a driver or owner/driver (1961, 1964, 1967, 1977) and one as an owner (1999). Bräck, who led the most laps in the race (66), took the lead for good at the end of lap 199. At the time, it equaled the official record for the latest lead change. However, unofficially, it was in fact the latest lead change in Indy history (until 2006), with Bräck assuming the lead approximately 2.8 miles to the checkered flag.

Post-race notes
In the engine battle between the Oldsmobile Aurora and the Nissan Infiniti, Aurora dominated the race, leading 196 of 200 laps. The top 15 starters used Auroras. Eddie Cheever performed the best of the Infiniti powerplants, leading the 4 laps not led by Aurora. Jeret Schroeder was the top finisher among Infiniti-powered cars, finishing 15th after dropping out late in the race.

Chilean driver Eliseo Salazar, who crashed out of the race in the opening laps, was awarded with the Scott Brayton trophy, awarded to the driver best exemplifying the character and racing spirit of the late driver Scott Brayton. Robbie Buhl, who struggled during practice and barely made the field on Bump Day, charged from 32nd starting position to finish 6th. He joined winner Bräck, and third place Billy Boat for three Foyt cars in the top six.

Scott Sharp, who qualified on the outside of the second row, suffered a humiliating gaffe when his pit crew neglected to remove the protective air blocks from the radiator inlets. The car pulled away from the grid with the air blocks still inserted, precipitating a swift and uncontrollable overheating condition. Though the crew was able to get the car back out on the track, the damage was done, and the car dropped out short of the halfway point with transmission and engine failure. The incident prompted some teams across the grid to pay more attention to pre-race checklists and affix fluorescent "warning strips" or brightly-colored flags to the air blocks and other similar devices to avoid similar failures in the future.

Linda Conti, the team manager for 5th place Robby McGehee, is believed to have been the first female team manager in Indy 500 history.

Results

 = former Indianapolis 500 winner;  = Indianapolis 500 rookie

*C Chassis: D=Dallara, G=G-Force, R=Riley & Scott

*E Engine: I=Infiniti, O=Oldsmobile

*T Tire: F=Firestone, G=Goodyear

Sports Illustrated controversy
On May 1, 1999, at the VisionAire 500K at Lowe's Motor Speedway three spectators were killed, and eight others (two of whom were children) were injured when a piece of debris went into the grandstands. On the 61st lap, Stan Wattles crashed in turn four, shearing off both right-side wheels. The car of John Paul Jr. struck one of the wheels, propelling it into the stands. A witness claimed a wheel with suspension pieces flew into the seats. The incident occurred two weeks before the Indianapolis Motor Speedway was scheduled to open for practice.

In the May 10, 1999, edition of Sports Illustrated, Ed Hinton penned an article reporting the tragedy, and discussed the general topic of safety in motorsports. The magazine's editors in New York published the article accompanied by an AP photograph taken at the scene. The photo featured a security guard standing next to two dead bodies in the grandstands covered with bloody sheets, and blood covering the steps.

In the week following the magazine's release, IMS/IRL president Tony George issued a letter stating his extreme displeasure with the article and the photo, describing that it was insensitive and inappropriate, and declared that Hinton was to be denied credentials to the 1999 Indianapolis 500 and future events at the track. Immediately after word of the ban spread, press and media response was very negative. The Chicago Tribune, The Detroit News, Los Angeles Times, and several other newspapers announced they were all boycotting the event, citing censorship. In addition, they came to the defense of Hinton, because he wrote only the text in the article, and did not know about the photograph until after the edition was published.

A few days later, the controversy reached a boiling point, and George backed down and retracted the ban. He issued Hinton his credentials, and most of the reporters (some reluctantly) returned to cover the race. However, the Hinton/censorship incident stayed in the news for a long time, and caused friction between the media and the still-fledgling league.

Due to the tragedy at Charlotte, the league adopted wheel tethers in time for the 1999 Indy 500 to prevent tires from flying off cars during crashes and potentially injuring spectators and drivers.

Race notes
Indy veteran Tony Stewart switched to the NASCAR Winston Cup Series full-time for 1999, but ran a one-off entry at Indianapolis as part of the Indianapolis 500/Coca-Cola 600 "Double Duty." On Pole Day, Stewart not only had to qualify for the Indy 500, but was also slated to race in The Winston. At Indy, Stewart was forced to settle for a slow qualifying speed, and wound up starting 24th. Later that evening Stewart won the Winston Open, and finished second in The Winston main event. On race day, Stewart finished 9th at Indy, four laps down. He quickly flew to Charlotte. At the start, he was moved to the rear of the field by rule for missing the mandatory drivers meeting. He led a number of laps, and finished 4th, despite fatigue and considerable fluid loss.
Robby Gordon and Roberto Moreno became the first two drivers to compete in a CART event and at the Indianapolis 500 on consecutive days. The Motorola 300 at Gateway was held on Saturday May 29. Moreno finished 4th, and Gordon crashed and finished 27th. Gordon and Moreno flew to Indy, and the following day competed in the 500.
The race was completed just prior to the start of another major sporting event in Indianapolis. Just six miles away at Market Square Arena, the Pacers hosted the Knicks in Game 1 of the Eastern Conference Finals.
Michael Buffer joined the public address crew as guest announcer.
It is believed that the 1999 race was the first since 1964 that George Snider did not participate in any capacity. Since 1965, Snider had driven in the race 22 times, and in other years served as a crew member.
Three episodes of COPS were filmed in the city of Indianapolis during race weekend of 1999. Footage of the 500 Festival Parade was shown, as well as police action outside the track the days leading up to the race.
During the offseason, the steel and glass Master Control Tower, which had stood along the mainstretch since 1957, had been partially dismantled in order to make way for construction of the new Pagoda. The timing and scoring floor from the old tower was left intact to house the race officials, but the upper floors were already demolished. The framework and elevator shafts for the new Pagoda had been erected, but it would not be completed until 2000. The Tower Terrace grandstands south of the Pagoda side had also been demolished, in order to clear the area for the new Formula One garages. Temporary bleachers were installed in that location, and the garages would be complete in time for the 2000 race.

Broadcasting

Radio
The race was carried live on the Indy Racing Radio Network. Mike King was named the new chief announcer, and became the fifth person to serve as Voice of the 500. Previous chief announcer Bob Jenkins left the radio to take over the announcing role on ABC-TV. The broadcast was heard on 556 affiliates.

The broadcasting booth for the 1999 race was located in a makeshift manner, temporarily installed in the then under-construction Pagoda. Booth announcers King, Rutherford, and others were situated in an elevator shaft, with no access to the ground or restrooms while the race was underway.

Gary Lee departed, and was replaced in turn three by Kevin O'Neal, a reporter from The Indianapolis Star and announcer from the Indianapolis Speedrome. It was O'Neal's only appearance on the network. Chris Denari also made his network debut.

With King as the new chief announcer, a trend returned to the broadcasts starting in 1999, not seen since the days of Sid Collins. King began to interview booth guests (celebrities, politicians, and sponsor representatives)
, whether live in-person, or pre-recorded. For 1999, the limitations of the booth precluded live interviews, but John F. Fielder of BorgWarner was featured in a pre-recorded segment.

Television
The race was carried live flag-to-flag coverage in the United States on ABC Sports. Changes were made at ABC/ESPN for 1999, as the networks created separate crews for their IRL and CART broadcasts. Paul Page, who had broadcast the 500 with either radio or television since 1974, was removed and shifted to the CART series. Bob Jenkins, formerly the radio network announcer for the 500, moved into the ABC-TV booth.

Tom Sneva returned as analyst, and for 1999 the "host" position was revived, with longtime ABC personality Al Michaels joining the crew. Jack Arute had left ABC for a short time to cover IRL races on Speedvision and FSN, and thus was absent from this telecast. Jon Beekhuis was brought in to take his place in the pit area. Meanwhile, Gary Gerould conducted the winner's interview in victory lane, which was normally Arute's duty.

With Paul Page not part of the broadcast, this was the first Indy 500 in over a decade without the familiar "Delta Force intro." In addition, a new camera angle debuted, mounted at the top of the famous scoring pylon.

Practice and time trials were carried over three networks: ABC, ESPN, and ESPN2. 
Live Daily Reports (ESPN2): Bob Jenkins, Johnny Rutherford (Sun.), Jon Beekhuis (Mon.-Fri.), Jerry Punch, Bob Varsha (Sun), and Gary Gerould.
Time trials (ABC): Jenkins, Tom Sneva, Beekhuis, and Gerould.
Time trials (ESPN/ESPN2): Jenkins, Rutherford, Punch, Gerould, and Varsha.
Carb Day (ESPN): Varsha, Rutherford, Punch, and Steven Cox.

At the track, several of the electronic dot matrix scoreboards were removed and replaced with four Daktronics ProStarä Video Plus screens and three Daktronics ProStarä large screens (one each inside the four turns, one each inside the two shortchutes, and one along the north end of the mainstretch). A year later, the project was completed, and an additional six Daktronics ProStarä video screens were installed along the inside and outside of the frontstretch.

Gallery

Notes

References

Works cited
1999 Indianapolis 500 Daily Trackside Report for the Media
Indianapolis 500 History: Race & All-Time Stats - Official Site
1999 Indianapolis 500 Radio Broadcast, Indianapolis Motor Speedway Radio Network

Indianapolis 500 races
Indianapolis 500
Indianapolis 500
Indianapolis 500
Indianapolis 500